FC Grenchen is a Swiss football club, based in Grenchen. They currently play in the 2. Liga, and play their matches at the Brühl Stadium.

History

FC Grenchen was founded in 1906. In 1937 they gained promotion to the top league of Swiss football, Nationalliga A, in these inter-war years they came runners-up in this league three times, and runner up in the cup, but their biggest success came post-war coming second in the league one further time before winning the cup the following season in 1960.

They got relegated from the top flight in 1986, and played in Nationalliga B until 1995 when they were relegated to the 1st Liga., where they currently play.

They won the Swiss Cup in 1959, which is their only one major title.

Stadium

Brühl Stadium is the biggest in the Canton of Solothurn. It comprises a space for 13,000 standing and a grandstand with 1,300 covered seats and 800 uncovered seats.

Current squad

Uhrencup

The Uhrencup is a pre-season football tournament hosted annually by FC Grenchen since 1962 (with the exception of 1967 and 1974), and is the oldest such tournament in Switzerland. They have won this tournament six times.

Honours

Nationalliga A
Runners-up (4) 1938–39, 1939–40, 1941–42, 1958–59
Schweizer Cup:
Winners (1): 1959
Runners-up (2): 1940, 1948, 1960

Former players

See

External links
Official Website 

Football clubs in Switzerland
Association football clubs established in 1906
Grenchen
1906 establishments in Switzerland